Mochras (sometimes known as Shell Island), is a peninsula lying west of Llanbedr in Gwynedd, Wales. It was formed after the River Artro was diverted by the Earl of Winchelsey in 1819 from its previous course where it entered the sea to the south of Mochras. Prior to this, access to the ancient settlement on the 'island' would have been through the village of Llandanwg, which is now across the estuary.

Mochras is known for the wide variety of seashells that wash up on the beach, and for its wild flowers. It is said to have been connected to the mythical Cantre'r Gwaelod.

Public vehicular access to the peninsula is only possible via a causeway across the estuary of the River Artro when the tide is out. Access on foot is always possible from the adjacent Morfa Dyffryn beach, which extends for several kilometres south of Mochras. Access to emergency vehicles is available at any time through the neighbouring airfield.

Mochras has a popular camp site which offers the opportunity to practise "wild camping" in pitches which are far from the nearest neighbour (and from toilet and other facilities). Camp fires are allowed on the beach; with only raised, contained fires and barbecues allowed on the campsite.

The peninsula lies within the Snowdonia National Park, as a result of which the campsite closes from the end of October to the following March. During this period, local farmers bring their sheep from the lowlands to graze on the 'island'.

Geology
Mochras is significant for the UK earth sciences. The area consists of a low lying raised beach (which encompasses the nearby Llanbedr Airport) and it caused a sensation (in the geological community, at least), when the Institute of Geological Sciences (now known as the British Geological Survey) drilled a 1,938 m deep stratigraphic proving borehole at Mochras Farm between late 1967 and late 1969. Beneath the obscuring recent beach cover, the Mochras Borehole found relatively young Tertiary and Mesozoic rocks (including a well-developed Upper, Middle and Lower Lias section towards the base of the Jurassic), faulted against the ancient Cambrian rocks of the Harlech dome. In 1971, the vertical throw of the fault was judged to be at least 4,500 metres (2¾ miles).

See also
Morfa Dyffryn
Sarn Padrig

References

External links
The Official Shell Island Campsite Website
Shell Island beach Guide

Llanbedr
Peninsulas of Wales
Landforms of Gwynedd
Coast of Gwynedd
Landforms of Snowdonia
Seaside resorts in Wales